A unitar is a one-stringed guitar.

UNITAR may also refer to:

 United Nations Institute for Training and Research
 Universiti Tun Abdul Razak, an institution of tertiary education in Malaysia